Stanisław Wagner (born 11 November 1947 in Starkówko) is a Polish former sprinter who competed in the 1972 Summer Olympics.

References

1947 births
Living people
Polish male sprinters
Olympic athletes of Poland
Athletes (track and field) at the 1972 Summer Olympics
People from Bytów County
Sportspeople from Pomeranian Voivodeship
Universiade medalists in athletics (track and field)
Universiade gold medalists for Poland
Medalists at the 1970 Summer Universiade
20th-century Polish people